Ramy Ditzanny is an Israeli poet who was born in 1950. His most famous poem is "Baal Akhshuv," which can be translated as "Lord of the Spiders." The name is a parody of Baal Zevuv, "Lord of the Flies." Subtle connections are made between the ancient Canaanites and the modern Palestinians.

Further reading 
 The Modern Hebrew Poem Itself, 2003, 

1950 births
Living people
Israeli male poets
Recipients of Prime Minister's Prize for Hebrew Literary Works
Date of birth missing (living people)